Pinebridge Coliseum, also known as The Bridge Coliseum, is a 5,000 seat indoor arena located in Spruce Pine, North Carolina. When it opened in 1983, it was the largest arena with an ice rink in North Carolina. It hosted the ice hockey team Pinebridge Bucks of the Atlantic Coast Hockey League from 1983 to 1985, becoming the smallest town to host a professional hockey team.

References

External links
 Venue information

Sports venues in North Carolina
Indoor arenas in North Carolina
Indoor ice hockey venues in the United States
Buildings and structures in Mitchell County, North Carolina
1983 establishments in North Carolina
Sports venues completed in 1983